Ostap Ortwin (real name Oskar Katzenellenbogen) (born 23 November 1876; murdered in spring 1942 in Lwów) was a Polish Jewish journalist and literary critic.

He was born in Tłumacz, near Stanisławów (now Ivano-Frankivsk, Ukraine). His father, Henryk, was a director and an engineer at a sugar factory, and his mother's name was Maria Jadwiga. In 1899 he finished law studies at the University of Lwów. His thesis adviser was the famous Polish logician and philosopher Kazimierz Twardowski.

He belonged to the Young Poland literary group "Płanetnicy", which met at the house of the poet Maryla Wolska. Wolska was considered to be of the most intriguing characters of the Lwów literary scene, known for his exhaustive knowledge of Polish law as well as a powerful physique and imposing presence .

His theatrical critiques were considered highly original and poignant. He was a frequent visitor at the "Kasyno Literackie" ("Literary Casino"), a cultural organization which held discussion nights and balls. Ortwin became widely known after he defended the literary critic and writer Stanisław Brzozowski in court.

In 1904 he gave up his law practice in order to focus on poetry and other writing, including theater reviews. In 1905 he became editor for the publishing house Polish Bookstore, owned by Bernard Połoniecki.

When World War I broke out he was drafted into the Austrian army where he began service as a private in the 55th Infantry Battalion. Later he was made a lawyer in the military court of Lwów and Ostrawa. He was promoted to the rank of captain, and soon after, major, of the military court of Lwów and in 1922 retired into the reserves.

He became the vice president of the Polish Writers' Union in 1920. In 1934 he was made the president of the Lwów Literary Club. He was a member of the Lwów-Warsaw School of Logic.

After Lwów was occupied by the Soviets in September 1939, he took part in creating a new literary organization, which gathered writers and poets opposed to communism. Lwów was taken over by Nazi Germany in 1942. Despite offers from his friends to help him escape the Holocaust, Ortwin refused to flee or to live in hiding. Sometime in 1942 he was shot in the street by the Nazis.

Józef Wittlin, in his essay My Lwów described him in the following words:

References

 Marek Sołtysik, "Niewygodny Ostap Ortwin" (The Incorrect Ostap Ortwin), Palestra, a Journal of Polish Lawyers, palestra.pl

1876 births
1942 deaths
Jews from Galicia (Eastern Europe)
Polish journalists
Polish literary critics
Polish theatre critics
Golden Laurel of the Polish Academy of Literature
Polish Jews who died in the Holocaust
People executed by Nazi Germany by firearm
Austro-Hungarian military personnel of World War I